Casa das Máquinas (English: Machine House) is a Brazilian rock band, formed in the 1970s.

History
The band was formed by Luiz Franco Thomaz, known as Netinho, member of the Os Incríveis who were looking for a sound that was less commercial and more up-to-date for their time. Their first album, Casa das Maquinas, was patterned after hard rock music while their next album, Lar de Maravilhas, adopted a more progressive style. Their third album, Casa de Rock, returned to their original style, going back to basic rock. After a near 30 years hiatus, the band decided to regroup.

Members

Current members
 Luiz Franco Thomaz (Netinho) – drums and percussion
 Mário Franco Thomaz (Marinho) – drums and vocals
 Andria Busic – Bass and lead vocals
 Faíska – Guitar
 Mário Testoni Jr. – organ, keyboard and piano

Past members
 José Aroldo Binda –  guitar and vocals
 Carlos da Silva – bass guitar and vocals
 Carlos Roberto Piazzoli – guitar, organ, bass 
 Maria José – vocals

Discography
 1974 – Casa das Máquinas 
 1975 – Lar de Maravilhas 
 1976 – Casa de Rock 
 1978 – Ao Vivo em Santos (bootleg)
 2000 – Pérolas (collection)
 2022 – Brilho nos Olhos

Brazilian rock music groups
Musical groups established in 1973
Musical groups disestablished in 1978
Musical groups reestablished in 2007
1973 establishments in Brazil
1978 disestablishments in Brazil
2007 establishments in Brazil